Beny Tchaicovsky (1954–2009) was a painter, musician and a multimedia computer artist. Tchaicovsky's paintings have been exhibited internationally in museums such as the Luxembourg Museum in Paris with the 1989 show "Les Trois Amériques à Paris", as well as in exhibitions in Germany, Brazil
 and the United States. Tchaicovsky's numerous awards include The Visionary, awarded first place for the best cyberposter on International Multimedia Day at the 49th Cannes Film Festival in 1996.

Career 

In the early 1990s, after two decades of a career as a painter and musician living in Europe, Tchaicovsky moved to Marin County in California and began expanding his 2D art into 3D and 4D.

In 1989 Tchaicovsky won a gold medal for his paintings at the International Connection Brazil-Japan Exhibition in Rio de Janeiro and First Place award with his painting "The Last Crusade" in a competition at the Natzoula Naveles Gallery in Davis, California.

In 1993 he established "ZOE Productions" a 3D computer animation company based in his studio in Fairfax, California. In 1994, segments of Tchaicovsky's animation were included in the VHS compilation The Gate to the Mind’s Eye, It featured, among others, his 3D animation  titled "Quantum Mechanics", which included segments of his short 3D animations titled "Modus Vivendi", "Delirium Tremendus" and "House of Mirrors". "Out of Step," "The Traveller" and "Intelligent Life", segments from Tchaicovsky's Cyberscape, were seen in the 1996 compilation Odyssey into the Mind's Eye, a 45-minute program and latest addition to the Mind’s Eye series distributed by Sony Music Video.

In 1997, after three years, Zoe Productions released its first full feature 3D computer animation project, Cyberscape: A Computer Animation Vision. The sound track was co-produced with Odyssey Productions and distributed by Sony Music Video. Cyberscape'''s original 3D animation was conceptualized and produced by Tchaicovsky.  

In 2001, Tchaicovsky released three more DVDs: the Morning Star Trilogy titled The Call (46:00 min), Caught Between Worlds (49:00 min) and Dimensional Connections (52:37 min). In 2005, Tchaicovsky completed two more 3D feature works, Memoirs of a Shadow (72 min) and Luz Oferenda (40 min). Tchaicovsky's last work, ZyconX1'' was unfinished.

Discography
Explorer (Album, 1983)

Style & Exploration of 3D tools as an art form

At an early age, Tchaicovsky started with black ink sketches before progressing to acrylic paintings. His canvasses depict surrealistic visions. 
Tchaicovsky's style of expression has been described as surrealist art, fantastic art, metaphysical art and visionary art.

Death 

In 2005, he returned to Rio de Janeiro and in 2007, after spending some time in Israel, he moved to the south of France where he spent the last two years of his life painting abstract images and photographing nature. Tchaicovsky passed away in his studio in Gassin in November 2009.

References

External links 
 "The Esoteric Realism of Beny Tchaicovsky" video with interviews
  Tchaicovsky Website
 This channel features the work of award-winning 3D animator Beny Tchaicovsky
 Tchaicovsky Facebook Page
 Discography

1954 births
2009 deaths
Artists from Rio de Janeiro (city)
Brazilian painters
Visionary artists
American surrealist artists
Brazilian surrealist artists
Brazilian animators
Artists from California